Feikje Anna Kalma (born 21 November 1999), commonly known as Fenna Kalma, is a Dutch professional footballer who plays as a striker for Eredivisie club Twente and the Netherlands national team.

Club career
A former player of CTO Eindhoven, Kalma joined Heerenveen in 2017. She made her debut for the club on 22 April 2017 in a 4–3 league defeat against Telstar.

Prior to the 2019–20 season, Kalma joined Twente. In 2021–22 season, she became the first player in Eredivisie history to score 30 league goals in a season. In May 2022, she extended her contract with Twente until June 2023. On 18 August 2022, she scored six goals in her team's 13–0 Champions League qualification round win against Moldovan club Agarista-ȘS Anenii Noi.

International career
Kalma has represented Netherlands at various youth levels. She was member of under-20 team at 2018 FIFA U-20 Women's World Cup.

In September 2019, Kalma received her first call-up to the senior team for UEFA Women's Euro 2022 qualification matches. In May 2022, she was named as a stand-by player for UEFA Women's Euro 2022. On 2 September 2022, she made her debut in a 2–1 friendly win against Scotland. She came on as a 62nd minute substitute for Vivianne Miedema and scored her team's winning goal.

Career statistics

Club

International

Scores and results list Netherlands' goal tally first, score column indicates score after each Kalma goal.

Honours
Twente
 Eredivisie: 2020–21, 2021–22
 Eredivisie Cup: 2019–20, 2021–22
 Dutch Women's Super Cup: 2022

Individual
 Eredivisie Player of the Year: 2021–22
 Eredivisie top scorer: 2021–22

References

External links
 
Senior national team profile at Onsoranje.nl (in Dutch)
Under-23 national team profile at Onsoranje.nl (in Dutch)
Under-20 national team profile at Onsoranje.nl (in Dutch)
Under-19 national team profile at Onsoranje.nl (in Dutch)
Under-17 national team profile at Onsoranje.nl (in Dutch)
Under-16 national team profile at Onsoranje.nl (in Dutch)

1999 births
Living people
Dutch women's footballers
Netherlands women's international footballers
Eredivisie (women) players
SC Heerenveen (women) players
FC Twente (women) players
Women's association footballers not categorized by position
21st-century Dutch women